Coldwater Township is an inactive township in Cass County, in the U.S. state of Missouri.

Coldwater Township was established in 1872, taking its name from Coldwater Creek.

References

Townships in Missouri
Townships in Cass County, Missouri